Tingena honorata is a species of moth in the family Oecophoridae. It is endemic to New Zealand and has been observed in the South Island including in Fiordland, Southland and Otago. This species has inhabits damp openings in native forest. The adults of this species are on the wing in December and January and are attracted to light.

Taxonomy 
This species was first described by Alfred Philpott in 1918 using specimens collected in Invercargill and at Knife and Steel harbour in Southland and named Borkhausenia honorata. George Hudson discussed and illustrated this species in his 1928 book The butterflies and moths of New Zealand also under the same name. In 1988 J. S. Dugdale placed this species in the genus Tingena. The male holotype specimen, collected at Knife and Steel harbour, is held in the New Zealand Arthropod Collection.

Description

Philpott described this species as follows:

This species is similar in appearance to Tingena chrysogramma but difference in the placement of the yellow marking on the forewings.

Distribution 
This species is endemic to New Zealand and has been observed in Fiordland, Southland and Otago.

Behaviour 
This species is on the wing in December and January and is attracted to light.

Habitat 
This species has been collected at damp openings in native forest.

References

Oecophoridae
Moths of New Zealand
Moths described in 1918
Endemic fauna of New Zealand
Taxa named by Alfred Philpott
Endemic moths of New Zealand